Melissa De Sousa is an American actress. She is best known for her role as Shelby in the 1999 romantic comedy-drama film The Best Man, its 2013 sequel The Best Man Holiday and the 2022 Peacock series The Best Man: The Final Chapters, Gabriella Jimenez in BET's Reed Between the Lines (2011), and Ana Lopez in Black Lightning.

Early life
Born and raised in New York City by Panamanian parents, Melissa De Sousa attended the High School of Performing Arts as a ballet major, and began her career as a principal dancer with The Alvin Ailey American Dance Company before transitioning into acting.

Career
De Sousa is best known for her performance as Shelby in the Universal Studios franchise The Best Man and The Best Man Holiday starring opposite Terrence Howard, for which she earned an NAACP Image Award nomination. Currently recurring as Mirta Herrera on Showtime's On Becoming a God in Central Florida, she also led the cult hit series Single Ladies for BET.

De Sousa also starred opposite Matthew Perry in the TNT original presentation of The Ron Clark Story, which garnered an Emmy nomination for Outstanding Made For Television Movie. Other film work includes Laurel Canyon, Miss Congeniality, and Constellation. Her television credits include series regular roles on Reed Between The Lines, Second Time Around, One on One, The $treet, Valley of the Dolls, and Damon. Guest star credits include Criminal Minds, Elementary, Shameless, and countless others.

In 2021, De Sousa appeared in the final season of Black Lightning as Police Chief Ana Lopez.

Personal life
De Sousa currently resides in New York.

Filmography

Film and TV Movies

Television

References

External links

Actresses from New York City
Panamanian actresses
American film actresses
American people of Panamanian descent
American television actresses
Hispanic and Latino American actresses
Living people
People from New York City
Year of birth missing (living people)